Silver wormwood may refer to at least two species of plants in the genus Artemisa:

 Artemisia cana, native to western and central North America
 Artemisia ludoviciana